Carson station or Carson Station may refer to:

Carson station (Charlotte), a Lynx Blue Line station in Charlotte
Carson (Los Angeles Metro station), in Los Angeles
Max Casino, formerly Carson Station, a casino in Carson City, Nevada